South Mill is the name of a number of mills

Windmills
United Kingdom
South Mill, Barney, a windmill in Norfolk
South Mill, Bishop Burton,  a windmill in the East Riding of Yorkshire
South Mill, Brancaster, a windmill in Noroflk
South Mill, Burnham on Crouch, a windmill in Essex
South Mill, Caister, a windmill in Norfolk
South Mill, Clavering, a windmill in Essex
South Mill, Devizes Castle, Devizes, a windmill in Wiltshire
South Mill, Easton, a windmill in Dorset
South Mill, Instow, a windmill in Devon
South Mill, Ludham Bridge, a trestle  mill in Norfolk  
South Mill, Ludham Bridge, a tower mill in Norfolk 
South Mill, Middleton, a windmill in Norfolk
South Mill, Pulham St Mary, a windmill in Norfolk
South Mill, Reedham, a drainage mill in Norfolk
South Mill, Ringstead, a windmill in Norfolk
South Mill, Runham Swim, a drainage mill in Norfolk
South Mill, Tengdrin, a windmill in Essex
South Mill, Wethersfield, a windmill in Essex
South Mill, Whissonsett a windmill in Norfolk
South Mill, Wiveton, a windmill in Norfolk
Navarino South Mill, Worthing, a windmill in West Sussex

United States
South Mill, Boston, a windmill in Massachusetts
South Mill, Dennis, a windmill in Massachusetts